Pteronia villosa is a species of evergreen, woody, perennial plants in the genus Pteronia. It is endemic to the Namaqualand region of Southern Africa.

Distribution 
Pteronia villosa is found in Namibia and the Northern Cape .

Conservation status 
Pteronia villosa is classified as Least Concern.

Gallery

References

External links 
 

Endemic flora of South Africa
Flora of South Africa
Flora of Southern Africa
Flora of the Cape Provinces
villosa